ComedySportz (CSz) is an improvisational comedy organization started in 1984 in Milwaukee, Wisconsin, by a group of local comedians including Dick Chudnow, Bob Orvis, Brian Green, and others.

Match format
The traditional format of a ComedySportz match features two teams of improvisational performers ("Players"), competing in various rounds, using improv games and performing scenes. Audience members judge the results and award points as directed by the Referee. In every match, a ComedySportz referee monitors the action, awarding points, and administering Fouls as necessary. The flavor is somewhat like the television show Whose Line Is It Anyway?, though the ComedySportz organization precedes that show's debut by 4 years. The CSz format is a more competitive and For Everyone (content-wise) version of the Theatresports format, which preceded ComedySportz by 7 years.

ComedySportz penalties (put in place for the audience's benefit) include:
 Out of Bounds Foul: called when a player uses explicit language or refers to something crass or off-color. If the Out of Bounds Foul is called, the offending player or audience member must spend the remainder of the game outside the theater space. They may or may not be welcomed back in. (Originally called the "Brown Bag Foul", the player would have a brown paper bag placed on their head for the rest of the round but replaced by the "Out of Bounds Foul" due to COVID-19 in 2022.)
 Groaner Foul: whereby any player who speaks a pun bad enough to make the audience groan causing their team to lose one point (or awarding the other team with a point), unless their apology to the audience is heartfelt enough and accepted.
Example: Why does the Norwegian navy put barcodes on ships? So they can Scandenavian
 Any spontaneously generated Foul the referee feels is needed to move the match forward.

Although the image of competition is maintained, the teams are often dynamic, with rosters depending on which player (many of whom have other occupations ) are available for a match at any given time, and match outcomes are not pre-determined as audience voting/selected judges decide the winner.

Organization

CSz Worldwide and ComedySportz are licensed by the World Comedy League Incorporated. There are over 28 cities with licensed ComedySportz organizations, most in the United States. In recent years, ComedySportz has been licensed in Manchester, England (although this team originated in Chorley, Lancashire) and Berlin, Germany.

Most ComedySportz cities operate their own "arenas," some with theatre type settings, others as nightclubs. Few (including ComedySportz Milwaukee) have their very own bar and restaurant. Sometimes the members of the comedic improv team also work sound and lights. The clean content and audience focused nature of the ComedySportz match allows CSz groups to perform thousands of road shows for corporate, college, church, school, and association clients each year; most CSz groups also lead corporate team-building workshops. In addition, players from some cities coach ComedySportz high school and middle school leagues, in which students perform in shows similar to those seen at the "professional" level.

World Championship
Teams meet annually at the ComedySportz World Championship for a competitive tournament, training, and exchange of artistic, marketing, and organizational ideas. The location of the tournament rotates among the member cities. The first world championship that Milwaukee won was in 1988. The banner hangs in the Milwaukee stadium. The first World Championship in Milwaukee's new arena was August 4–7, 2004, also served as the Grand Opening for Milwaukee's all-new ComedySportz Arena at 420 South 1st Street in Milwaukee. In 2009, the World Championship returned to Milwaukee for the 25th anniversary celebration, and returned again in 2014 to celebrate both its 30th anniversary and rebranding of the logo.

Prior to 2004, this mostly annual event was billed as the "ComedySportz National Tournament."

In 2020 and 2021 due to the COVID-19 Pandemic the championships were held online. Portland defeated Jersey Shore in the 2021 Championship match.

Championship history

{| class="wikitable" border="1"
|-
! Year
! Host City
! World Champion
|-
| 2022
| Seattle, Washington
| Seattle
|-
| 2021
| Online
| Portland
|-
| 2020
| Online
| Houston
|-
| 2019
| Philadelphia, Pennsylvania 
| Philadelphia
|-
| 2018
| Los Angeles, California 
| Los Angeles
|-
| 2017
| San Jose, California 
| San Jose
|-
| 2016
| Indianapolis 
| Indianapolis
|-
|2015
| Quad Cities IA & IL
| Quad Cities
|-
| 2014
| Milwaukee
| Milwaukee
|-
| 2013
| Buffalo, New York
| Buffalo
|-
| 2012
| Chicago
| Chicago
|-
| 2011
| Indianapolis
| Indianapolis
|-
| 2010
| Philadelphia
| Philadelphia
|-
| 2009
| Milwaukee
| DRAW - Milwaukee & Twin Cities
|-
| 2008
| Portland, Oregon
| Portland
|-
| 2007
| Quad Cities, IA & IL
| Quad Cities
|-
| 2006
| San Jose, California
| San Jose
|-
| 2005
| Los Angeles
| Los Angeles
|-
| 2004
| Milwaukee
| Minneapolis
|-
| 2003
| Washington DC
| Washington DC
|-
| 2002
| Quad Cities, IA & IL
| Quad Cities
|-
| 2001
| Chicago
| Chicago
|-
| 2000
| Austin
| Austin
|-
| 1999
| Portland
| Portland
|-
| 1998
| Milwaukee
| Milwaukee
|-
|}

Notable players and alumni
 Steve Agee (The Sarah Silverman Program)
 James Thomas Bailey (The Drew Carey Show)
 Joe Bereta (YouTube personality, Barats and Bereta)
 Wayne Brady (Whose Line Is It Anyway?, Let's Make A Deal)
 Liz Cackowski (writer, Saturday Night Live, Last Man On Earth)
 Frank Caeti (MADtv)
 Kay Cannon (producer/writer, 30 Rock, New Girl, Pitch Perfect, Pitch Perfect 2, Pitch Perfect 3)
 Jeremy Carter (Superego)
 Bill Chott (actor, Wizards of Waverly Place, Galaxy Quest, The Dana Carvey Show)
 Jeff Davis (Whose Line Is It Anyway?, Harmontown)
 Jack DeSena (actor, All That, Avatar: The Last Airbender)
 Matt Gourley (Superego, Drunk History, The Pistol Shrimps Radio, Conan O'Brien Needs a Friend)
 Dan Harmon (Community, Rick and Morty, Harmontown)
 Dustin Hodge (producer/writer, Little Britches Rodeo (TV series))
 Derek Mears (actor, Friday the 13th)
 Kevin Miller (voice actor) (Sly Cooper)
 Eric Christian Olsen (actor, NCIS: Los Angeles, Community, Beerfest)
 Jack Packard (RedLetterMedia contributor on Best Of The Worst)
 Eric Price (MADtv)
 Lauren Pritchard (MADtv)
 Rob Schrab (Scud: The Disposable Assassin, The Sarah Silverman Program)
 Iliza Shlesinger (stand-up comedian, winner of NBC's Last Comic Standing; numerous Netflix specials)
 Matt Sloan (director, voice actor, playwright, and comedian)
 Ari Stidham (actor, musician, Scorpion)
 Jason Sudeikis (cast, Ted Lasso, Saturday Night Live, Horrible Bosses)
 Nick Swardson (stand-up comedian, writer & producer, Reno 911!: Miami, Grown Ups 2)
 Chris Tallman (Thank God You're Here, The Thundermans)
 Victor Varnado (actor, comic book writer, End of Days)
 Jessica Williams (correspondent on The Daily Show , actor in The Incredible Jessica James)

See also
 Improvisational theatre
 Whose Line Is It Anyway?
 The Second City
 Saturday Night Live
 Theatresports
 List of improvisational theatre companies

References

External links
Home page for ComedySportz and CSz Worldwide
Official ComedySportz Milwaukee website

Improvisational troupes
Culture of Milwaukee
American comedy troupes
1984 establishments in California